First Hampshire & Dorset is a bus operator providing services in the counties of Hampshire and Dorset. It is a subsidiary of FirstGroup.

History
First Hampshire & Dorset was created out of various different smaller companies which were merged once FirstGroup had acquired them.

In October 1995 FirstGroup purchased the bus services in Fareham, Gosport and Portsmouth operated by People's Provincial. In April 1996 FirstGroup purchased services in Portsmouth from Transit Holdings trading as Red Admiral & Blue Admiral, which in turn had taken over the Portsmouth CityBus operations under the title of Southdown Portsmouth. This operation was then put under the control of People's Provincial and the whole renamed to First Provincial.

In 1997 FirstGroup purchased Southampton Citybus and after a brief period of using the Citybus name, the operation was renamed First Southampton. In 1999 First Southampton merged with First Provincial to form First Hampshire, later being renamed First Hampshire & Dorset.

In 1999 FirstGroup purchased Southern National with its Dorset operations merged to form First Hampshire & Dorset in 2003.

In 2010 The headquarters was moved from Portswood where Southampton Citybus was based to a new site in Empress Road by the River Itchen in Southampton, whilst the former depot was closed and sold off, ending 130 years of its purpose as a depot.

In November 2022 FirstGroup announced that it's Southampton-based operations would be withdrawn, citing low patronage numbers and sustainability issues. The final day of its operations was on 18 February 2023.

Divisions 
First Hampshire and Dorset operate within six different cities within the two counties and are grouped into the following divisions:

First Portsmouth, Fareham & Gosport 

First Portsmouth, Fareham & Gosport run multiple different services within Portsea island and the Gosport Peninsula with the majority of the routes run using the Solent Branding. In this division there are 16 routes which are divided into routes in Fareham and Gosport and routes in Portsmouth. The routes in Fareham can cover from Sarisbury and Wickham to Portchester and Gosport. The majority of the routes in Fareham and Gosport either end or stop via Fareham. The routes in Portsmouth have destinations in Southsea, Eastney and Hilsea with some going into Waterloovile and Southampton. Their fleet ranges from ADL Enviro200 MMCs and Wright Streetlites to Wright Eclipse Geminis and Optare Solos.

The Star 

The Star (stylised as THE STAR) is one of the brands that First Portsmouth, Fareham & Gosport use which follows along the A3 that replaced the Portsdown and Horndean tram service which had been superseded by motor buses in 1935. The brand itself was started in 2008 with the creation of the A3 corridor. There are two routes under this brand: Route 7 runs along London road (A2407) from Portsmouth university via Cosham and Crookhorn before ending in Wecock Farm whilst route 8 uses the A3 starting its journey at Old Portsmouth Clarence Pier via The hard, Cosham, Purbrook and Horndean and terminating at Catherington.

Eclipse 

Eclipse is one of the brands that First Portsmouth, Fareham & Gosport use which uses an unguided busway that runs from Redlands Lane to Rowner Road, however the full route runs from Fareham Bus Station to Gosport Ferry in an attempt to reduce congestion on the A32 and improve connectivity between the two towns.

First Wessex, Dorset & Somerset 

First Wessex, Dorset & Somerset operate services situated near the coastline in Weymouth. This division was created as a result of the purchase and later split of Southern National and the Dorset operations was merged into what would become First Hampshire and Dorset. 

The division operates a number of services in and around Weymouth, five are branded under the "Jurassic Coaster" name. Most of the divisions services operate within Weymouth Town Centre, connecting it with Dorchester, Portland, Chickerell, Littlemoor and Preston. The division also operates summer only services to the Waterside and Littlesea Holiday Parks. The only exception is service 6 which operates between Bridport and Yeovil.

Services are operated using a mixture of Wright Streetlite, Volvo B7RLE Wright Eclipse 2, Optare Solo SR and Alexander Dennis Enviro400 vehicles.

Jurassic Coaster 

Jurassic Coaster is the brand given to several of the routes running along the Jurassic coast.

The network is currently formed of five routes, all of which run to a two-hourly frequency:
 Route X51 runs from Weymouth to Axminster via Dorchester, Bridport and Lyme Regis
 Route X52 runs from Wool to Bridport via Lulworth Cove, Weymouth and Abbotsbury (runs during the summer only using open-top buses)
 Route X53 runs from Weymouth to Axminster via Abbotsbury, Bridport and Lyme Regis
 Route X54 runs from Weymouth to Poole via Lulworth Cove, Wool and Wareham
 Portland Coaster route 501 from Weymouth to Portland Bill via Wyke Regis, Fortuneswell and Southwell (runs during the summer only using open-top buses) 

The Jurassic Coaster services are operated using a mixture of Volvo B7TL Alexander Dennis ALX400, Volvo B7TL Wright Eclipse Gemini, Volvo B9TL Wright Eclipse Gemini 2, Alexander Dennis Enviro400 and Alexander Dennis Enviro400 MMC vehicles.

Former operations 
First Southampton
First Southampton had ran their buses using the "city red" branding, which in 2014 started to replace and rebrand routes that were previously under the generic First livery. They had nine routes that cover from Totton and Millbrook to Sholing and West End with all but one route terminating at the city. The city red branding initially consisted of 30 buses, with a fleet of Volvo B7RLE Wright Eclipse Urbans and Wright Streetlites before expanding. The branding itself was reminiscent of the previous Southampton Citybus operator that used to run in the city. The buses that were inherited from Southampton Citybus were either repainted or transferred to other FirstGroup divisions and by the mid 2010's any remaining step entrance buses were sold or scrapped.

For a time, First Southampton had run routes to the University of Southampton as an agreement with them for three years in 1998, under the Unilink brand. These had gas powered Duple Dartlines with the Dennis Dart chassis liveried in a mix of blue and pink colours.

Due to low patronage numbers and sustainability issues, the company announced its intention to close it's Southampton division in November 2022. All routes ran under First Southampton were withdrawn on 18 February 2023, with most of its routes taken over by Bluestar.

Fleet

As of February 2023, the fleet consisted of 258 buses. These are broken down into the following divisions.

 The Portsmouth, Fareham & Gosport division has 149 buses spread over its Hilsea and Hoeford depots.
 The Southampton division had 55 buses in its single depot.
 The Wessex, Dorset & Somerset division has 54 buses in its single depot.

History 
In Weymouth, First operate a number of Wright StreetLite buses on routes 1, 2, 3, 4, 8 and 10 purchased between 2013 and 2014. Several Optare Solos purchased in 2014, working primarily on routes 3, 6 and 8. Wright Eclipse-bodied Volvo B7RLEs which started operation in 2008 which was subsequently replaced by Wright Eclipse Urban 2s in 2017 which were displaced to other FirstGroup divisions. Several Wright Eclipse Gemini bodied Volvo B9TLs operating mostly on route X53 between Poole and Axminster were bought in 2008. Six Scania N94UDs were bought in 2004 & 2005 operating on route X51, which had left the fleet earlier in 2020.

In Portsmouth, First bought several new buses between 2015 and 2020 to replace older buses running on these routes, with Wright Streetlite MAX buses being bought for the "Solent Rangers" routes which link Southampton with Portsmouth and Gosport to replace the Scania N94UB Omnicitys that covered the route in late 2015. ADL Enviro200 MMCs were bought for the Eclipse busway in 2016 to replace the Wright Eclipse 2s which were displaced and sent to Manchester. Enviro200 MMCs were purchased again in 2020 with start-stop technology for "The Star" routes to replace the older Wright Streetlite MAXs which had been running on the route before. These buses were transferred over to the Southampton division to replace the Wright Eclipse buses that were branded for route 3.

In Southampton, First inherited a large number of Leyland Atlanteans from Southampton Citybus along with Leyland Lynxs, Leyland Olympians and gas powered Dennis Darts. All of these have now been withdrawn from the Southampton fleet. An unusual vehicle inherited from the Provincial fleet was the first ACE Cougar, one of just two built, which has also been withdrawn.

First introduced a number of bus types that are also no longer in service in Southampton; these include Volvo B7LA / Wright Eclipse Fusion bendy buses introduced in 2000 but transferred to First Glasgow in 2003 after they proved unsuitable for a number of Southampton roads, former First Capital Dennis Arrows proved unpopular in Southampton and moved onto First Greater Manchester in 2006. First had operated Optare Solos on the free City-link service between Southampton Central Station, West Quay Shopping Centre and Town Quay, these left the Southampton fleet when First lost the City-link contract to Unilink, which subsequently became franchised to Bluestar in 2008. The fleet that remains in Southampton were all Wright Streetlite buses, with the last of the Wright Eclipse Urban-bodied Volvo B7RLEs transferring to First Wessex in August 2020 though in April 2021, First had introduced Wright Streetdecks into the fleet to improve service capacity.

See also 

 List of bus companies in the United Kingdom

References

External links
First Hampshire
First Dorset & South Somerset
(Archived) First Southampton

FirstGroup bus operators in England
Transport in Dorset
Bus operators in Hampshire